Hanover Park is a village in Cook and DuPage counties in the U.S. state of Illinois, a suburb of Chicago. The population was 37,470 at the 2020 census. Ontarioville is a neighborhood within the village.

Geography
Hanover Park is located at  (41.978827, −88.146109).

Demographics
As of the 2020 census there were 37,470 people, 11,064 households, and 9,177 families residing in the village. The racial makeup of the village was 37.14% White, 7.10% African American, 1.64% Native American, 17.02% Asian, 0.06% Pacific Islander, 21.38% from other races, and 15.67% from two or more races. Hispanic or Latino of any race were 41.53% of the population.

There were 11,064 households, out of which 78.49% had children under the age of 18 living with them, 59.01% were married couples living together, 16.99% had a female householder with no husband present, and 17.06% were non-families. 12.41% of all households were made up of individuals, and 4.98% had someone living alone who was 65 years of age or older. The average household size was 3.71 and the average family size was 3.42.

The village's age distribution consisted of 27.9% under the age of 18, 9.1% from 18 to 24, 28.5% from 25 to 44, 24.1% from 45 to 64, and 10.4% who were 65 years of age or older. The median age was 34.2 years. For every 100 females, there were 90.9 males. For every 100 females age 18 and over, there were 95.8 males.

The median income for a household in the village was $77,367, and the median income for a family was $80,815. Males had a median income of $43,375 versus $31,368 for females. The per capita income for the village was $26,823. About 11.4% of families and 12.8% of the population were below the poverty line, including 18.6% of those under age 18 and 10.4% of those age 65 or over.

Note: the US Census treats Hispanic/Latino as an ethnic category. This table excludes Latinos from the racial categories and assigns them to a separate category. Hispanics/Latinos can be of any race.

Education
The town is served by several school districts. One is Elgin Area School District U46, a Unit School District. Almost 40,000 children of school age are in its area. U-46 is the second largest in Illinois behind Chicago Public Schools. Other school districts serving Hanover Park include Schaumburg Township Elementary School District 54, Township High School District 211, Community Consolidated School District 93, Glenbard Township High School District 87, Keeneyville School District 20 and Lake Park High School District 108. A total of six different public high schools serve the village.

 Streamwood High School
 Bartlett High School
 Schaumburg High School
 Hoffman Estates High School
 Lake Park High School
 Glenbard North High School

Transportation 
Hanover Park has a station on Metra's Milwaukee District/West Line, which provides daily rail service between Elgin, Illinois and Chicago, Illinois (at Union Station). In Metra's zone-based fare system, Hanover Park is in zone F.

Notable residents 
 Jeffrey and Jill Erickson, bank robber couple
 Christopher Kolk, photographer of celebrity and fashion 
 Jon Walker, bassist from American pop punk pop band Panic! At The Disco and lead guitarist (and occasionally the lead singer) of The Young Veins
 Nadia Ianakieva, author of The Red Dress Decision.
Eira L. Corral Sepulveda of Hanover Park is the first Latina and youngest person elected to Metropolitan Water Reclamation District

Parks and libraries
The Hanover Park Park District is a general park district established by the voters of Hanover Park in 1964. The park district is responsible for the maintenance, operation and administration of parks and park facilities and is governed by five commissioners elected at large for overlapping, four-year terms.

The Hanover Park Park District maintains 21 park sites encompassing.
Poplar Creek Public Library District
Schaumburg Township District Library - serves area of Hanover Park in Schaumburg Township (Cook County - east of Barrington Rd and north of Barrington and Lake St.)
Hanover Park Park District

Sister cities 
  Cape Coast, Ghana
  Valparaíso, Mexico

References

External links

 

 
Chicago metropolitan area
Villages in Cook County, Illinois
Villages in DuPage County, Illinois
Villages in Illinois
Populated places established in 1958
1958 establishments in Illinois
Majority-minority cities and towns in Cook County, Illinois
Majority-minority cities and towns in DuPage County, Illinois